Kaleboğazı can refer to:

 Kaleboğazı, Amasya
 Kaleboğazı, Oltu